Hillerman is a surname. Notable people with the surname include:

 Anne Hillerman,  American journalist and author
 John Hillerman (1932–2017), American character actor
 Tony Hillerman (1925–2008), American author